Road Trips Volume 3 Number 3 is a live album by the American rock band the Grateful Dead.  Recorded on May 15, 1970, and released on June 14, 2010, it was the 11th of the "Road Trips" series of albums, and the first to contain three discs instead of two.

Recording

Road Trips Volume 3 Number 3 was billed as a 40th anniversary celebration of the album Workingman's Dead.  It includes several versions, some acoustic and some electric, of seven of the eight songs that appear on that album, omitting only "High Time".  The album contains material from two concerts — the early show and the late show — performed on May 15, 1970, at the Fillmore East in New York City.  Like many early 1970 Grateful Dead shows, these concerts featured both acoustic and electric sets.  The New Riders of the Purple Sage (NRPS), with whom Jerry Garcia was playing pedal steel guitar, also performed at these concerts, between the Dead's acoustic and electric sets.  The NRPS sets are not included on this release.

Bill Graham is heard introducing the band at the early show, identifying them as "Pigpen on organ"; "from Atherton, California, this is Mr. Robert Weir"; "from Marin Junior College, Mr. Philip Lesh" (to which Bob Weir responds, "That's a lie!" followed by Garcia remarking, "That ain't Philip Lesh"); "from 710 Ashbury Street, Mr. Jerry Garcia"; and "on drums, the son of Lenny Hart, Mickey Hart."  Hart's father was the Grateful Dead's original money manager and had disappeared with approximately $155,000 of the group's profits only two months before. 

A fourth, "bonus" disc was included with early shipments of the album.  The bonus disc contains additional material from the same concerts as well as four songs from the concert held the previous evening, May 14, 1970, at Meramec Community College in Kirkwood, Missouri.  The version of "Easy Wind" from May 15 was previously released on the album Fallout from the Phil Zone.  Including the material from the bonus disc, this release includes both May 15, 1970 Fillmore East Shows in their entirety except for the acoustic performance of "Candyman" from the late show.

Another live Grateful Dead album recorded during this same month is Dick's Picks Volume 8, which also includes both acoustic and electric sets.

Sound quality

The album was released in HDCD format.  This provides enhanced sound quality when played on CD players with HDCD capability, and is fully compatible with regular CD players.

Track listing

Disc One

May 15, 1970: Fillmore East, New York, NY
Early Show: Acoustic:

Early Show: Electric:

Early Show: Encore: Electric:

Disc Two

May 15, 1970: Fillmore East, New York, NY
Late Show: Acoustic:

Late Show: Electric:

Disc Three

May 15, 1970: Fillmore East, New York, NY
Late Show: Electric:

Late Show: Encore: Acoustic:

Bonus Disc

May 15, 1970: Fillmore East, New York, NY
Early Show: Acoustic:

Early Show: Electric:

Late Show: Electric:

May 14, 1970: Meramec Community College, Kirkwood, Missouri

Personnel

Grateful Dead

 Jerry Garcia – Electric and Acoustic Lead Guitar, Vocals
 Mickey Hart – Drums
 Bill Kreutzmann – Drums
 Phil Lesh – Electric Bass, Vocals
 Ron "Pigpen" McKernan – Vocals, Organ, Percussion, Harmonica, Acoustic Guitar
 Bob Weir – Electric and Acoustic Rhythm Guitar, Vocals

Additional musicians
 John Dawson – harmony vocals on "A Voice from On High" and "Cold Jordan"
 David Nelson – mandolin on "A Voice from On High" and "Cold Jordan"

Production

Produced by Grateful Dead
Compilation Produced by David Lemieux & Blair Jackson
Recorded by Bob Matthews
CD Mastering by Jeffrey Norman at Mockingbird Mastering, Petaluma, CA
Cover Art by Scott McDougall
Interior Photos by Amalie Rothschild and Peter Simon
Historical Essay by Blair Jackson
Package Design by Steve Vance

Full Set Lists

Following are the full set lists for the concerts included in Road Trips Volume 3 Number 3:

May 14, 1970 - Meramec Community College, Kirkwood, Missouri
Acoustic Grateful Dead "Don't Ease Me In", "Friend of the Devil", "Deep Elem Blues", "Silver Threads and Golden Needles", "Candyman"
New Riders of the Purple Sage "Six Days on the Road", "Whatcha Gonna Do", "Brown-Eyed Handsome Man", "I Don't Know You", "Cecilia", "Can't Pay the Price", "Henry (interrupted)", "Henry", "Garden of Eden", "Fair Chance to Know", "Last Lonely Eagle", "Lodi", "Honkytonk Woman", "The Weight"
Electric Grateful Dead "Casey Jones", "China Cat Sunflower" > "I Know You Rider", "Mama Tried" > "High Time", "Drums" > "Good Lovin'" > "Drums" > "Good Lovin'", "Good Morning Little Schoolgirl", "Me & My Uncle", "Dire Wolf", "Cold, Rain & Snow", "Attics of My Life", "Cumberland Blues", "New Speedway Boogie"** > "Nobody's Fault But Mine Jam"** > "New Speedway Boogie"** > "St. Stephen"** > "Not Fade Away"** > "Turn On Your Lovelight"**
Encore: "Cold Jordan"

May 15, 1970, Early Show - Fillmore East, New York, New York
Acoustic Grateful Dead "Don't Ease Me In"*, "I Know You Rider"*, "Ain't It Crazy (The Rub)"*, "Friend of the Devil"**, "Long Black Limousine"*, "Candyman"**, "Cumberland Blues"**, "New Speedway Boogie"*, "Cold Jordan"** (with New Riders)
New Riders of the Purple Sage "Six Days on the Road", "Whatcha Gonna Do", "I Don't Know You", "Henry", "Portland Woman", "Fair Chance to Know", "Last Lonely Eagle"
Electric Grateful Dead' "Casey Jones"*, "Easy Wind"**, "Attics of My Life"**, "St. Stephen"* > "Cryptical Envelopment"* > "Drums"* > "The Other One"* > "Cryptical Envelopment"* > "Cosmic Charlie"*
Encore: "New Minglewood Blues"*

May 15, 1970, Late Show - Fillmore East, New York, New York
Acoustic Grateful Dead "Deep Elem Blues"*, "The Ballad of Casey Jones"*, "Silver Threads and Golden Needles"*, "Black Peter"*, "Friend of the Devil"*,  "Uncle John's Band"*, "Candyman", "She's Mine"*, "Katie Mae"*, "A Voice From On High"*
New Riders of the Purple Sage "Brown-Eyed Handsome Man", "Louisiana Lady", "Can't Pay the Price", "Truck Drivin' Man", "All I Ever Wanted", "Workingman's Blues",  "Henry", "I Don't Know You",  "Lodi", "Last Lonely Eagle", "Mama Tried"@,"Sawmill"@, "Me & My Uncle"@, "Connection"@ (@ with Bob Weir)
Electric Grateful Dead' "China Cat Sunflower"* > "I Know You Rider"*, "Cumberland Blues"*, "Hard to Handle"*, "Beat It On Down The Line"**, "Morning Dew"*, "Good Lovin'"*, "Dire Wolf"*, "Next Time You See Me"**, "Dark Star"* > "St. Stephen"* > "Not Fade Away"* > "Turn On Your Lovelight"*
Encore: "Cold Jordan"* (with New Riders)

*Included in the Road Trips Volume 3 Number 3

**Included in the Road Trips Volume 3 Number 3 bonus disc

References

Road Trips albums
2010 live albums